Abram Schlemowitz (July 19, 1910 – November 13, 1998) was an American sculptor, and a member of American Abstract Artists. He was a 1963 Guggenheim Fellow.

Schlemowitz taught at the Pratt Institute, and Kingsborough Community College. His papers are held at the Archives of American Art.

Exhibitions
1971– NYU Loeb Student Center.

References

External links
 Official website
 Abram Schlemowitz, ca. 1950
 Getty Images – Closing Night At The Cedar Street Tavern
 Abram Schlemowitz exhibition poster – Howard Wise Gallery | Flickr – Photo Sharing!

1910 births
1998 deaths
Pratt Institute faculty
20th-century American sculptors
20th-century American male artists
American male sculptors